Jack de Vries may refer to:

Jack de Vries (politician) (born 1968), Dutch politician
Jack de Vries (soccer) (born 2002), American soccer player